The Greek landing at Smyrna (Occupation of İzmir) was a military operation by Greek forces starting on May 15, 1919 which involved landing troops in the city of Smyrna and surrounding areas.  The Allied powers sanctioned and oversaw the planning of the operation and assisted by directing their forces to take over some key locations and moving warships to the Smyrna harbor.  During the landing, a shot was fired on the Greek 1/38 Evzone Regiment and significant violence ensued with Greek troops and Greek citizens of Smyrna participating.  The event became important for creating the three-year-long Greek Occupation of Smyrna and was a major spark for the Greco-Turkish War (1919–1922).

Prelude
At the end of World War I (1914–1918) and with the Armistice of Mudros that ended the Ottoman front of World War I, the allies began a series of peace talks focused on the Partitioning of the Ottoman Empire.  During Paris Peace Conference, 1919 the Italians landed and took over Antalya and began showing signs of moving troops towards Smyrna. When the Italians left the meeting in protest over other issues, British Prime Minister David Lloyd George and Greek Prime Minister Eleftherios Venizelos pushed a concocted report in the peace negotiations alleging that the Christian populations were under direct threat to convince France and the U.S. to support a Greek takeover of the Aidin Vilayet centered in Smyrna. Borders and terms of the Greek occupation were not decided but in early May 1919, the Allied powers supported Greek troops landing in Smyrna and moved a number of battleships into the area to prepare for the landing.

While negotiations were still in progress, Venizelos informed Clemenceau of the deterioration of the situation in Aidin Vilayet, where the local governor, Nureddin Pasha, was ordering Muslim groups to commit excesses against the Greek population. The British intelligence was also informed of the deterioration of law and order in the area and the Italian role in provoking this situation. In early May, Venizelos reported instances of Italian–Turkish cooperation to the Supreme Allied Council and requested that Allied vessels should be sent to Smyrna. This request, although initially accepted by the council, was not carried out immediately. Under this context, the British Prime Minister and the Foreign Office were the main supporters of the Greek landing, with the purpose "to restore public order and forestall the massacres".

Turkish reactions
The Society for the Defense of Ottoman Rights in Izmir<ref>Erik-Jan Zürcher, The Unionist Factor: the Rôle of the Committee of Union and Progress in the Turkish National Movement, 1905–1926, BRILL, 1984, p. 92.</ref> (İzmir Müdafaa-i Hukuk-ı Osmaniye Cemiyeti) was organized to prepare for the arrival of Greek troops. Nureddin Pasha was appointed governor of the Aidin Vilayet and Aidin Area Command (Aydın Bölge Komutanlığı), and supported activities of the Society for the Defense of Ottoman Rights in Izmir. But he resigned under pressure of the Allied Powers. "Kambur" Kurd Ahmed Izzet Pasha was appointed as new governor on March 11, and retired general Ali Nadir Pasha was appointed to the post of military commander on March 22, 1919.

Allied fleet
In the early weeks of May 1919, allied warships entered the area to prepare for the operation.  British Admiral Somerset Gough-Calthorpe was the primary commander for the operation involving British, U.S., French, Italian, and Greek forces. On May 11, 1919, Rear Admiral Mark L. Bristol, the Commander of US Naval Detachment in Turkish Waters), came to Izmir from Istanbul on a battleship. The British forces would occupy Karaburun and Uzunada, French forces would occupy Urla and Foça, Greek forces would occupy Yenikale fortress.

The Greek landing

On the afternoon of May 11, 1919, the Commander of the 1st Infantry Division of the Hellenic Army, positioned in Kavala, Colonel Nikolaos Zafeiriou, received orders for the operation. The next morning, the landing force, consisting of 13,000 soldiers, as well as auxiliary personnel, 14 transport ships and escorted by 3 British and 4 Greek destroyers, headed to Smyrna. Zafeiriou's order to his soldiers, who learned about their destination only after the departure, was the following:

On May 14, 1919, the Greek mission in Smyrna read a statement announcing that Greek troops would be arriving the next day in the city. Smith reports that this news was "received with great emotion" by the Greek population of the city while thousands of Turkish residents gathered in the hill that night lighting fires and beating drums in protest.The night before the landing all the Turks staying as lodgers in the Greek Quarters of the 1st and the 2nd Cordon were massacred along with their families. For that reason none of the Turks dared to uproach the Greek quarter in the morning. Therefore the accountants started giving all the 3 montly payments to the soldiers and the officers to prevent money being stolen by the Greeks. Later, translations of proclamations issued by the Turks during this occasion, showed that the intention was not purely pacific resistance. The same night, several hundred prisoners, mostly Turks, were released from a prison, with the complicity of the Ottoman authorities and Italian major in charge of the prison. Some of them armed purchased arms from a depot near the barracks.

The Greek occupation of Smyrna started the following day, where thousands were gathered on the seafront, waving Greek flags on the docks where the Greek troops were expected to arrive. The Metropolitan of Smyrna, Chrysostomos of Smyrna blessed the first troops as they arrived at 08:00. A colonel, who had neither the will nor the prestige to force himself relentlessly on his men, was in charge of the operation and neither the appointed High Commissioner nor high-ranking military individuals were there for the landing resulting in miscommunication and a breakdown of discipline. Most significantly, this resulted in the 1/38 Evzone Regiment landing north of where they were to take up their post. As a result, they had to march south passing a large part of the Greek crowds celebrating the landing and also the Ottoman government Konak and the barracks of Ottoman troops. A Turk fired a shot (Smith indicates that no one knows who fired the shot) and chaos resulted with the Greek troops firing multiple shots into the Konak and the barracks. The Ottoman troops surrendered and the Greek regiment begun marching them up the coast to a ship to serve as a temporary prison. Allied officers in the harbor reported seeing Greek troops bayoneting multiple Turkish prisoners during the march and then saw them thrown into the sea. Prisoners were forced to shout "Long live Venizelos!" and "Long live Greece!".The ones who did not shout like Colonel Süleyman Fethi Bey or Pharmacist Captain Ahmet Bey, the uncle-in-law of Fahrettin Altay and many others like the journalist Hasan Tahsin were martyred with bayonets.  Donald Whittall, a British citizen and one of the few neutral observers during the landing, remarked about the treatment of Turkish prisoners, "They were made to go through no humiliation and received a good deal". But Whittall estimated that thirty unarmed prisoners were slaughtered.  The captain of  reported that a Turkish officer, marching with his hands up, veered out of line. He was hit by a Greek soldier's rifle butt on the back of his head. When he tried to stand up he was hit again and bayoneted, before the top of his head was blown off.This claim was also verified by first-lieutenant Zekai Kaur, a Cretan Turk who was made a prisoner and put into the Greek transatlantic ship "Patris", on 15th of May 1919 and was among the prisoner column in the streets until they reached the cargo deck of the prisoner ship. He saw many among the his column being pulled away, beaten, wounded and being killed where stopping meant death. While 2 Greek journalists were searching & shouting for him to take revenge on Kaur being a Greek-speaking officer in the Censorship Bureau. Kaur saw that a "bulky" priest, Chrysostomos of Smyrna, with a cross in one hand and a knife in the other executed a Turkish soldier in front of the Greek civilian crowd cheering in Cafe Foti (Klonaridis).

Violence and disorder followed the landing and Greek troops and Greek citizens of Smyrna participated in these actions. Some shops belonging to Jews were also plundered by Greek soldiers. For the days following the landing, Greek troops arbitrarily detained around 2,500 people. Looting of Turkish houses in the city and in the surrounding areas began on the night of May 15 and continued for many days after that. The Inter-Allied Commission of Inquiry reported that:

Admiral Calthorpe left the area on May 21 and on May 23, the Greek commander in the area went against orders issued by the Allies and Venizelos by ordering the expansion of military operations in Aydın and Şuhut. These operations initially did not face significant resistance, but ethnic violence erupted along the way leading to significant violence and chaos; particularly in the Battle of Aydın from May 27 until June 27, 1919.  In many areas, Greek forces demobilized the Ottoman police and then left the area resulting in Turkish mobs looting Greek property and killing Greek citizens. This was retaliation for atrocities committed by Greek soldiers and civilians in Smyrna and the surrounding area against Turks.

When the atrocities were exposed and condemned by the British House of Commons on 26 June, Venizelos faced British diplomatic pressure to conduct an official inquiry.
Court martial on August 15, 1919 led by the Greek High Commissioner for the violence on May 15 and May 16 pronounced 74 convictions (including 48 Greeks, 13 Turks, 12 Armenians and one Jew).

According to the Inter-Allied Commission of Inquiry, the casualties on 15 May were as follows: Greek army (2 killed, 6 wounded); 100 Greek civilians (20 killed, 20 drowned, 60 wounded); 300-400 Turkish civilians killed or wounded.
Eyewitnesses in Smyrna reported higher civilian casualties among the Turks. Regarding the Greek casualties, he estimated 2 killed and 15-20 wounded soldiers, 20-30 killed and 40-50 wounded civilians Reverend Alexander MacLachlan, a Canadian in charge of the international college at Smyrna, estimated 500 Turks killed in his "Statement of an Eyewitness". He however mentions that his estimate on the evening of the landing was inaccurate and stated that if he made his statement a week later he would have given 800-1000 Turks killed only in the center of Smyrna on the first day. The estimates were far lower than the actual numbers as they did not count the dead thrown into sea. MacLachlan stated that: 

MacLachlan's claim is also verified by Kaur. Many naked bodies of the Turks everyday on the following days were washed up on the shores of İzmir some of these were Turkish Military Personnel and Civilians who were huddled in to the prisoner ship "Patris". Zekai Kaur being a prisoner on the ship states that the officers were put into the ship's hold full of artillery carrier animals' dungs and after the visit and the protest of a Scottish officer they were put to the upper decks. During their imprisonement Greeks threw overboard and drowned anyone who went up to get air. These bodies also hit the shore days later due to tide in the sea. The revend also states that many local Armenians and Jews were also "victims of that day and night of terror" and that he saw the bodies of a Jewish lad and the father of an Armenian student of his, since they were mistaken by the Greek soldiers and Greek locals as being Turks since some of them were wearing fez, which was attributed to being Turkish.

Impacts

The Greek army from the first started showing the signs that they had not come for a temporary occupation but rather for a permanent annexation; to incorporate western Anatolia into Greece. This intention was already clear to some Turks after seeing which territories that Greeks had occupied. The Turkish reaction to these developments was anger, resulting in violence in the region. After the initial shock of the landing, Turkish groups started retaliating by committing excesses against the civilian Greek communities residing outside of the occupation zone. While there were large demonstrations against Allied Forces in Istanbul, in Anatolia first armed clash between Turks and Greeks occurred on 28 May at Ödemiş. This was between a small body of Turks and the Greek Army. Afterwards, Turkish guerrilla warfare flared up along the line of Greek advance.

It created the Smyrna Zone that administered the area from 1919 until September 9, 1922. After the violence in May 1919, many of the allies began to limit their support for the operation: France and Italy all became resistant to permanent Greek occupation and the stillborn Treaty of Sèvres in 1920 gave administrative control of the area to Greece, while Turkey would retain sovereignty, with permanent sovereignty to be decided after 5 years. The landing in Smyrna was sanctioned by article 69 also signed by the grand vizier of the Ottoman Empire on behalf of the Ottoman Sultan Mehmet VI. On the other hand it fuelled the Turkish nationalist movement under Mustafa Kemal and large scale atrocities against the Pontic Greek population in Eastern Anatolia. The Greek occupation ended when Turkish forces entered Smyrna (İzmir) on September 9, 1922.

See also
Megali Idea
Occupation of Smyrna
Hasan Tahsin
 Outline and timeline of the Greek genocide

References

Bibliography
 Celal Erikan, Komutan Atatürk, Cilt I-II, Üçüncü Basım, Türkiye İş Bankası Kültür Yayınları, İstanbul, 2001, . 
 Hakkı Güvendik, Türk İstiklâl Harbi, Batı Cephesi, Yunanlıların Batı Anadolu'da İstila Hareketlerine Başlamaları, İzmir’in İşgali, Mustafa Kemal Paşa'nın Samsun’a Çıkması, Millî Mukavemet'in Kurulması (May 15ıs – 4 Eylül 1919), Cilt 2, Kısım. 1, Genkurmay Başkanlığı Basımevi, Ankara, 1963. 

Michael Llewellyn-Smith, Ionian Vision : Greece in Asia Minor, 1919-1922., C. Hurst, 1999, London, New edition, 2nd impression.
 Zekeriya Türkmen, Mütareke Döneminde Ordunun Durumu ve Yeniden Yapılanması (1918–1920)'', Türk Tarih Kurumu Basımevi, 2001, .

External links
 Greek Occupation of Izmir and Adjoining Territories: Report of the Inter-Allied Commission of Inquiry (May–September 1919), SAM, 1999.
 Greek atrocities in the Vilayet of Smyrna (May to July 1919) Inedited documents and evidence of English and French officers, published by the Permanent bureau of the Turkish Congress in Lausanne

Smyrna
Smyrna landing 1919
1919 in the Ottoman Empire
1919 in Greece
Aidin Vilayet
History of Aydın Province
History of İzmir Province
History of Balıkesir Province
20th century in İzmir
History of Ayvalık
May 1919 events
Megali Idea
Landing operations